Shockwave was a family of jet-powered American trucks, including Shockwave, a 1984 Peterbilt 359 truck tractor, and Super Shockwave, a 1957 Chevy truck.

Shockwave 

Shockwave was the first of the Shockwave trucks.
Shockwave was driven by Chris Darnell, who used the truck to compete against planes going  in a rolling drag race at airshows, often winning. It consumed fuel at a rate equal to 400 gallons per mile, even more when the afterburners were activated. To slow the truck down at the end of a race it needed 2 aircraft parachutes

On July 2, 2022, at 1:10 pm EDT at the Battle Creek Field of Flight and Balloon Festival at Battle Creek Executive Airport in Battle Creek, Michigan, the Shockwave Jet Truck experienced a catastrophic rollover event following a mechanical failure, killing the driver Chris Darnell and destroying the truck. The performance involved Darnell racing against two inverted aircraft from a standing start while driving through a large pyrotechnic display, and had been successfully demonstrated by Darnell numerous times in the past. Video of the performance showed Darnell's truck outpacing one of the airplanes overhead and about to overtake another when his truck caught fire and appeared to roll. Darnell Motorsports owner and co-driver Neal Darnell, also father of Chris, attributed his son's crash to a mechanical failure, he said in a Facebook post that evening.

Super Shockwave 

The Super Shockwave was the more recent of the two trucks.  The truck has two Westinghouse J34-48 jet engines. The truck is built on a 1957 Chevy cab. In the full mile, the truck is able to reach . The Super Shockwave was purchased from the Shockley family by Hayden Proffitt Racing and renamed “Hot Streak II”. Les Shockley had obtained his start in racing through crewing for Hayden Proffitt himself. Hayden Proffitt's first jet car was named “Hot Streak I”.

References

External links

Trucks
Jet cars